Zia Hussain (born 1 July 1938) is a Hong Kong field hockey player. He competed in the men's tournament at the 1964 Summer Olympics.

References

External links
 

1938 births
Living people
Hong Kong male field hockey players
Olympic field hockey players of Hong Kong
Field hockey players at the 1964 Summer Olympics
Place of birth missing (living people)
Hong Kong people of Pakistani descent